Coon Rapids–Foley Boulevard is a planned infill station on the Northstar commuter rail line in Coon Rapids, Minnesota, United States, at the site of a current Metro Transit park and ride facility.  The station was originally included in Northstar plans, but it was cut in order to meet the Federal Transit Administration's cost-effectiveness index (CEI).

The current park-and-ride facility is located on a sliver of land in between Minnesota State Highway 610 and Foley Boulevard.  It has 3,200 parking spaces with a surface lot and a two-story parking ramp, giving it more than four times the capacity of the largest existing Northstar station, Elk River (754 spaces).  Despite the fact that it already existed and would be a significant source of riders, calculation of the cost-effectiveness index was biased toward saving time of commuters.  Riders would not save enough time by changing from the existing bus service to rail, so the station was dropped.

Anoka County and the city of Coon Rapids have been acquiring land and making arrangements for matching funds for the station.  It is expected to cost approximately $15 million to build the station.  Construction will likely occur along with a related project to add a third set of rails along this stretch of track, which is the busiest in Minnesota.  The third main line will allow additional passenger rail traffic, including the proposed Northern Lights Express project to connect to Duluth.  The station will serve both lines, since it is nicely located just south of Coon Creek Junction where the BNSF Hinckley Subdivision branches off of the Staples Subdivision main line.

References

Northstar Line stations
Transportation in Anoka County, Minnesota
Proposed railway stations in the United States